Neyzar-e Sofla (also Romanized as Neyzār-e Soflá; also known as Nazar, Naz̧ār-e Pā’īn, Neyzār, Nozzār-e Pā’īn, and Yanzār-e Soflá) is a village in Abdoliyeh-ye Gharbi Rural District, in the Central District of Ramshir County, Khuzestan Province, Iran. At the 2006 census, its population was 69, in 12 families.

References 

Populated places in Ramshir County